Dinko Halachev (born 22 October 1984) is a former professional Bulgarian tennis player. On 24 May 2010, he reached his highest ATP singles ranking of 857 whilst his best doubles ranking was 512 on 30 December 2013.  Known associate of Keith Tarter.

Year-end rankings

Challenger and Futures Finals

Doubles: 13 (2–11)

Davis Cup 
Dinko Halachev debuted for the Bulgaria Davis Cup team in 2014. Since then he has 2 nominations with 1 tie played, his singles W/L record is 0–1 and doubles W/L record is 0–0 (0–1 overall).

Singles (0–1) 

RPO = Relegation Play–off

References

External links
 
 
 

Bulgarian male tennis players
1984 births
Living people
People from Haskovo
Sportspeople from Haskovo Province
21st-century Bulgarian people